Torbenia aurivilliusi is a butterfly in the family Lycaenidae. It is found in Cameroon, Equatorial Guinea, Gabon and the Republic of the Congo. The habitat consists of forests.

References

External links 
 
 

Butterflies described in 1967
Poritiinae